The 1978 Cathay Trust Championships was a men's tennis tournament played on indoor carpet courts in Taipei, Taiwan that was part of the 1978 Colgate-Palmolive Grand Prix. It was the second edition of the tournament and was held from 13 November through 19 November 1978. Second-seeded Brian Teacher won the singles title.

Finals

Singles
 Brian Teacher defeated  Tom Gorman 6–3, 6–3, 6–3
 It was Teacher's 1st singles title of the year and the 2nd of his career.

Doubles
 Butch Walts /  Sherwood Stewart defeated  Mark Edmondson /  John Marks 6–2, 6–7, 7–6

References

External links
 ITF tournament edition details

Taipei Summit Open